The 2022–2023 mpox outbreak in Singapore is a part of the global outbreak of human mpox caused by the West African clade of the monkeypox virus. According to the Ministry of Health (MOH), Singapore's first imported mpox case was reported on 20 June 2022. It was the first ever confirmed case in Southeast Asia.

Background

Arrival 
The Ministry of Health (MOH) detailed that the patient is a 42-year-old British man who works as a flight attendant. He was reportedly in Singapore between 15 to 17 June 2022 and again on 19 June as he flew in and out of Singapore. He tested positive for mpox on 20 June.

On 6 July, it was confirmed that a 45-year-old Malaysian man tested positive becoming the first locally unlinked infection in the country.

Situation 
As of 5 August 2022, there are 10 locally transmitted cases and 5 imported cases in the country, all of whom are in stable conditions or ready to be discharged.

Notes

References

External links 

 Official monkeypox update by the Ministry of Health
 Agency's FAQ website
 SUMMARY OF CONFIRMED MONKEYPOX CASES IN SINGAPORE

Singapore
Mpox
2022 in Singapore
2022 disasters in Singapore